Waginger See is a lake in the Alpine foothills, Bavaria, Germany. Geologically, it forms one single lake with the Tachinger See, with which it is connected through a narrow strait at Tettenhausen. Its primary inflows are Schinderbach, Höllenbach and Tenglinger Bach, and it is drained by the Götzinger Achen.

References 

Lakes of Bavaria
LWaginger